Züri brännt (titled Züri brännt in English) is a 1981 Swiss documentary film directed by the Swiss filmmakers Markus Sieber, Ronnie Wahli, Marcel Müller, Thomas Krempke. Beginning on 22 January 2015, the film was shown during the Solothurn Film Festival as one of the milestones of Swiss film history.

Background 
Züri brännt or Opernhauskrawalle, literally meaning "Zurich is burning", is the Swiss German term generally used for the youth protests in May 1980 in the Swiss city of the same name, in the Canton of Zurich. Violent protests against extremely high cultural subsidies by the city which had also neglected alternative governmental cultural programs for Zurich`s youth, occurred in 1980 during the so-called Opernhauskrawall, or the Zurich Opera House riots.  The protests took place on 30/31 May 1980 at the Sechseläutenplatz square in Zurich, but also throughout the whole city, spreading to other municipalities of Switzerland in 1980 and again in 1981. These protests marked the beginning of the alternative youth movement in Switzerland. A first political compromise was the establishment of the AJZ (a short-lived alternative youth centre at the Zurich main station), and the opening of the Rote Fabrik alternative cultural centre in Wollishofen in late 1980. Rote Fabrik still exists, and claims to be one of the most important alternative cultural venues in the greater Zurich urban area. The most prominent politician involved in these developments was Emilie Lieberherr, then member of the city's executive (Stadtrat) authorities.

The documentary was based on the original black and white material filmed at the locations of the youth protests in May 1980 and afterwards. It first aired on Swiss television SRF in May 2014.

Festivals 
 Solothurn Film Festival 2015

References

External links 
 
 

Swiss documentary films
Documentary films about Switzerland
1981 films
Punk films
Hippie films
Films shot in Zürich
Swiss German-language films
1981 documentary films
History of Zürich
Youth in Switzerland
Black-and-white documentary films
Culture of Zürich
20th century in Zürich